Amaxia lepida is a moth of the family Erebidae. It was described by William Schaus in 1912. It is found in Costa Rica.

References

Moths described in 1912
Amaxia
Moths of Central America